The robust skink (Oligosoma alani, formerly Cyclodina alani)  is a large, rare species of lizard in the family Scincidae. The species is endemic to New Zealand.

Geographic range
O. alani was once widespread throughout the North Island but has been wiped out in most parts of its former range by predation from several species of introduced rats. It now occurs naturally only on six small islands off the north-eastern coast of the North Island.

Etymology
The specific epithet, alani, was given by the describer Joan Robb in honour of her nephew, Alan Robb.

Behaviour and habitat
The robust skink is strongly nocturnal and lives under rocks, or in seabird burrows, tree stumps, and fallen logs. It prefers well vegetated areas with plenty of leaf litter and tolerates coastal areas as long as there is dense vegetation cover. Studies of the robust skink show that it is unusually vulnerable to losing water through its skin, which may explain its preference for damp environments such as crevices, bird burrows, rotting logs, and closely matted vegetation.

Reproduction
O. alani is viviparous.

References

Further reading
Hardy GS (1977). "The New Zealand Scincidae (Reptilia: Lacertilia); a taxonomic and zoogeographic study". New Zealand Journal of Zoology 4 (3): 221–325. (Cyclodina alani, new combination, p. 270).
Hoskins AJ, Hare KM, Miller KA, Schumann N, Chapple DG (2017). "Repeatability, locomotor performance and trade-offs between performance traits in two lizard species, Oligosoma alani and O. smithi ". Biological Journal of the Linnean Society 122 (4): 850–859.
Robb J (1970). "A new skink of the genus Leiolopisma from New Zealand". Proceedings of the Koninklijke Nederlandse Akademie van Wetenschappen (Serie C) 73: 228–229. (Leiolopisma alani, new species).

Reptiles of New Zealand
Oligosoma
Endemic fauna of New Zealand
Reptiles described in 1970
Taxa named by Joan Robb
Taxonomy articles created by Polbot
Endemic reptiles of New Zealand